Košarkaški klub Zdravlje, commonly referred to as KK Zdravlje or Zdravlje Leskovac, is a men's professional basketball club based in Leskovac, Serbia. They are currently competing in the top-tier Basketball League of Serbia.

Home arena

The SRC Dubočica is a multi-purpose indoor arena located in Leskovac and it has a capacity of 3,600 seats.

Players

Current roster

Coaches

  Boško Đokić
  Ivan Tometić (1992–1993)
  Jovica Arsić (1999–2003)
  Jovica Arsić (2006–2007)
  Dragan Arsić (2007)
  Zoran Jović (2007–2008)
  Saša Jović (2008–2009)
  Ivan Zdravković (2012–2013)
  Saša Jović (2015)
  Siniša Stošić (2015–216)
  Saša Jović (2017–2018)
  Dragan Arsić (2018)
  Marko Dimitrijević (2018–2019)
  Lazar Spasić (2019–2022)
  Nikola Ristić (2022–present)

Trophies and awards

Trophies 
 Second League of Serbia (2nd-tier)
 Winners (1): 2020–21
 Cup of Serbia (2nd-tier)
 Winners (1): 2007–08
 Yugoslav Cup (defunct)
 Runners-up (1): 1999–00

Notable players
  Vukašin Aleksić
  Dragan Dojčin
  Uroš Lučić
  Slobodan Mitić
  Miljan Pavković
  Saša Stanković
   Stefan Jović

International record

References

External links
 
 KK Zdravlje at srbijasport.net
 KK Zdravlje at eurobasket.com

Zdravlje
Zdravlje
Basketball teams established in 1964
Sport in Leskovac